James Backhouse (1825–1890) was an English botanist, archaeologist, and geologist. He was the son of James Backhouse (1794–1869), a botanist and missionary in Australia.

Life
Backhouse was educated at Lawrence Street School, (which later became Bootham School), York. He worked in Norway, Ireland, and Scotland, and was particularly known for his work on the flora of Teesdale. He was a correspondent of Charles Darwin.

He was also a member of the Religious Society of Friends, also known as the Quakers.

James Backhouse is known as "James Backhouse (4)", because he was the fourth in a line of James Backhouses:
 James Backhouse (1), 1720–1798, the founder of Backhouse's Bank.
 James Backhouse (2), 1757–1804.
 James Backhouse (3), 1794-1869, the Quaker missionary and founder of the Backhouse Nursery.
His son was also a James Backhouse:
 James Backhouse (5), 1861–1945, best known as an ornithologist.

Notes

References
Desmond, Ray. 1994. Dictionary of British and Irish botanists and horticulturists including plant collectors, flower painters and garden designers. New edition, revised and completely updated with the assistance of Christine Ellwood. London: Taylor & Francis & the Natural History Museum, 1994.

1825 births
1890 deaths
English botanists
English Quakers
People educated at Bootham School
People from Darlington